Trichilia pittieri is a species of plant in the family Meliaceae. It is endemic to Costa Rica.

References

Flora of Costa Rica
pittieri
Vulnerable plants
Taxonomy articles created by Polbot